is a Japanese light novel series written by Mizuho Itsuki and illustrated by Fuumi. It began serialization online in November 2018 on the user-generated novel publishing website Shōsetsuka ni Narō. It was later acquired by Fujimi Shobo, who have published seven volumes since September 2019 under their Fujimi Fantasia Bunko imprint. A manga adaptation with art by kirero has been serialized online via Kill Time Communication's Comic Valkyrie website since December 2020. It has been collected in three tankōbon volumes. An anime television series adaptation by ENGI aired from October to December 2022.

Characters

A 15-year-old girl and the titular novice alchemist. She was orphaned at a young age and aims to be an alchemist just like her late parents. Although she originally had long hair, she cut it short.

Media

Light novel

Manga

Anime
On September 18, 2021, an anime television series adaptation was announced by Fujimi Fantasia Bunko. The series was produced by ENGI and directed by Hiroshi Ikehata, with Shigeru Murakoshi overseeing series scripts, Yōsuke Itō designing the characters and serving as chief animation director, and Harumi Fuuki composing the music. It aired from October 3 to December 19, 2022, on AT-X, Tokyo MX, KBS Kyoto, SUN, and BS NTV. Aguri Ōnishi performed the opening theme song , while Nanaka Suwa performed the ending theme song "Fine Days". The series is licensed outside of Asia by AMC Networks through its subsidiary Sentai Filmworks, and is streaming on HIDIVE.

Notes

References

External links
  at Shōsetsuka ni Narō 
  
  
  
 

2019 Japanese novels
Anime and manga based on light novels
ENGI
Fujimi Fantasia Bunko
Japanese webcomics
Kadokawa Dwango franchises
Light novels
Light novels first published online
Seinen manga
Sentai Filmworks
Shōsetsuka ni Narō
Webcomics in print